Homoeosoma botydella is a species of snout moth in the genus Homoeosoma. It was described by Ragonot in 1888. It is found in Niger and South Africa.

References

Phycitini
Moths described in 1888
Snout moths of Africa
Moths of Africa